Andy Sinclair is a Canadian writer, whose debut novel Breathing Lessons was a shortlisted nominee for the Lambda Literary Award for Gay Fiction at the 28th Lambda Literary Awards.

Sinclair was born in Cowansville, Quebec and raised in North Bay, Ontario, and is currently based in Toronto. Breathing Lessons was published by Véhicule Press in 2015.

He has also published short stories in fab, Plenitude, Dragnet and The Moose & Pussy.

References

21st-century Canadian novelists
21st-century Canadian short story writers
Canadian male novelists
Canadian male short story writers
Canadian LGBT novelists
Canadian gay writers
People from Cowansville
People from North Bay, Ontario
Writers from Toronto
Writers from Quebec
Living people
21st-century Canadian male writers
Year of birth missing (living people)
21st-century Canadian LGBT people
Gay novelists